Russell Theodore Ober III (born August 13, 1938) is an American politician from the state of New Hampshire. He is a former member of the New Hampshire House of Representatives, sitting as a Republican from the Hillsborough 37 district, having been first elected in 2006, and previously serving from 2002 to 2004. In 2021, after his wife, Lynne Ober, was stripped of her committee leadership position, he resigned alongside her.

References

Living people
1938 births
Republican Party members of the New Hampshire House of Representatives
People from Hudson, New Hampshire
University System of Maryland alumni
Central Michigan University alumni
Syracuse University alumni
21st-century American politicians